Aponsu is a surname. Notable people with the surname include:

 Chrishen Aponsu (born 1994), Sri Lankan cricketer
 Jayasekara Aponsu (born 1951), Sri Lankan actor, director, and writer

Sinhalese surnames